Netheemey is a Maldivian romantic crime web series written and directed by Moomin Fuad. It stars Ahmed Sharif and Washiya Mohamed in main roles. The pilot episode of the series was released on 29 September 2022. The series follows an irresponsible, spoilt kid who moves away from his family with his wife only to reunite with his ex-lover living in the opposite apartment.

Cast and characters

Main
 Ahmed Sharif as Hassan Raqib
 Nathasha Jaleel as Hudha
 Ismail Rasheed as Adheel
 Washiya Mohamed as Sausan
 Ahmed Asim as Rizvi
 Ismail Zahir as Khalid
 Mariyam Shakeela as Zuleykha
 Imadh Ali as Jinah
 Mariyam Majudha as Soany

Recurring
 Salava Sarah Ahmed Shammaan Nazeer
 Hussain Nazim as Shaggy; Sausan's friend
 Fathimath Visama as Mai; Sausan's friend
 Shaanih Ali as Micky; Sausan's friend
 Fathimath Latheefa as Nafeesa; Sausan's step-mother
 Aisha Ali as Sausan's step-sister
 Ali Farooq as Sausan's father
 Ali Fizam as Sufian

Guest

 Khadheeja Kiyara Ibrahim
 Abdulla Rasheed Moosa
 Fazeel Ali
 Husseyn Adnan
 Ahmed Adam
 Parvathee Khadche
 Mohamed Rafeeu
 Ahmed Shiyam
 Mohamed Ziyad
 Ali Rasheed
 Muslima Hassan
 Aishath Anjal
 Mariyam Azka Ahmed Shaukath
 Ansham Mohamed
 Ibrahim Muneez
 Mohamed Musthafa
 Zack Ahmed
 Aishath Razaan Ramiz
 Mohamed Ajuvadhu
 Azmy Adam

Episodes

Development
The project was announced on 10 August 2022 with the first trailer, as the next directorial venture by Moomin Fuad. Revealing the lead cast as Ahmed Sharif, Washiya Mohamed and Nathasha Jaleel, Fuad announced that the first season of the series consists of total five episodes. Filming for the series took place in Male' and post-production was completed in August 2022. During the time, Fuad shared that he anticipates to commence filming for the second season latest by October 2022.

Soundtrack

Release and reception
The first episode of the series was released on 29 September 2022 through Baiskoafu. Upon release the series received mainly positive reviews from critics, where its screenplay and direction by Moomin Fuad was particularly praised: "There are several unresolved questions that we need answers from. A second season with these answers are all what the audience need right now". 

Last episode of the first season reveals the tentative date for the release of second season as April 2023.

References

Serial drama television series
Maldivian television shows
Maldivian web series